Rihards Leja (born 28 July 1992) is a Latvian handball player for Celtnieks Rīga and the Latvian national team.

He represented Latvia at the 2020 European Men's Handball Championship.

References

1992 births
Living people
Latvian male handball players
People from Dobele